The 1886 Detroit Wolverines had the best winning percentage of any major league baseball team to play in Detroit.  They compiled a record of 87–36 for a .707 winning percentage.  Nevertheless, the Wolverines finished in second place, 2½ games behind the Chicago White Stockings.

Regular season

Season standings

Record vs. opponents

Roster

Player stats

Batting

Starters by position 
Note: Pos = Position; G = Games played; AB = At bats; R = Runs; H = Hits; Avg. = Batting average; Slg. = Slugging percentage; HR = Home runs; RBI = Runs batted in

Other batters 
Note: G = Games played; AB = At bats; R = Runs; H = Hits; Avg. = Batting average; Slg. = Slugging percentage; HR = Home runs; RBI = Runs batted in

Note: pitchers' batting statistics not included

Pitching

Starting pitchers 
Note: G = Games; IP = Innings pitched; W = Wins; L = Losses; ERA = Earned run average; SO = Strikeouts

Relief pitchers 
Note: G = Games pitched; W = Wins; L = Losses; SV = Saves; ERA = Earned run average; SO = Strikeouts

Awards and honors

League top ten finishers 
Lady Baldwin
 NL leader in wins (42)
 NL leader in strikeouts (323)
 NL leader in shutouts (7)
 NL leader in walks plus hits per 9 innings pitched (WHIP) (0.967)
 NL leader in hits allowed per 9 innings pitched (6.86)
 #3 in NL in ERA (2.24)
 #3 in NL in win percentage (.764)
 #2 in NL in strikeouts to walks (3.23)
 #3 in NL in strikeouts per 9 innings pitched (5.97)
 #4 in NL in games (56)
 #4 in NL in innings pitched (487)
 #4 in NL in games started (56)
 #4 in NL in complete games (55)
 #5 in NL in walks per 9 innings pitched (1.85)
 #5 in NL in Adjusted ERA+ (147)

Dan Brouthers
 NL leader in slugging percentage (.581)
 NL leader in OPS (1.026)
 NL leader in total bases (284)
 NL leader in doubles (40)
 NL leader in home runs (11) (tied with Richardson)
 NL leader in runs created (126)
 NL leader in extra base hits (66)
 NL leader in at bats per home run (44.5)
 #2 in NL in on-base percentage (.445)
 #2 in NL in triples (15)
 #2 in NL in times on base (247)
 #3 in NL in Power/Speed Number (14.4)
 #3 in NL in at bats per strikeout (30.6)
 #3 in NL in batting average (.370)
 #3 in NL in plate appearances (555)
 #3 in NL in runs scored (139)
 #3 in NL in hits (181)
 #4 in NL in runs scored (125)
 #4 in NL in bases on balls (66)

Pretzels Getzien
 #5 in NL in win percentage (.732)

Ned Hanlon
 NL leader in games played (126)
 #2 in NL in outs (378)
 #3 in NL in stolen bases (50)
 #4 in NL in plate appearances (551)
 #5 in NL in at bats (494)

Hardy Richardson
 NL leader in at bats (538)
 NL leader in plate appearances (584)
 NL leader in hits (189)
 NL leader in home runs (11) (tied with Brouthers)
 NL leader in singles (140)
 NL leader in Power/Speed Number (17.4)
 #2 in NL in at bats per home run (48.9)
 #2 in NL in games finished (pitcher) (4)
 #3 in NL in games played (125)
 #3 in NL in total bases (271)
 #3 in NL in stolen bases (42)
 #4 in NL in runs created (109)
 #4 in NL in extra base hits (49)
 #5 in NL in times on base (235)
 #5 in NL in batting average (.351)
 #5 in NL in slugging percentage (.504)
 #5 in NL in OPS (.906)

Jack Rowe
 #4 in NL in RBIs (87)

Sam Thompson
 NL leader in double plays by an outfielder (11)
 #3 in NL in at bats (503)
 #3 in NL in RBIs (89)
 #4 in NL in singles (117)

Deacon White
 #4 in NL in singles (117)
 3rd oldest player in NL (38)

Players Ranking Among Top 100 of All Time at Position 
The following members of the 1886 Detroit Wolverines are among the Top 100 of all time at their positions, as ranked by The New Bill James Historical Baseball Abstract in 2001:
 Charlie Bennett: 49th best catcher of all time
 Dan Brouthers: 18th best first baseman of all time
 Fred Dunlap: 89th best second baseman of all time
 Hardy Richardson: 39th best second baseman of all time
 Deacon White: 76th best third baseman of all time
 Billy Shindle: 95th best third baseman of all time (played only 7 games for the 1886 Wolverines)
 Sam Thompson: 37th best right fielder of all time

External links 
 Baseball-Reference.com 1886 Detroit Wolverines Regular Season Statistics

Detroit Wolverines seasons
Detroit Wolverines season
Detroit Wolv
1880s in Detroit